Bathyamaryllis kapala is a species of amphipod in the family Amaryllididae, and was first described in 2002 by James K. Lowry and Helen E. Stoddart.

The species holotype (AM P36868) is female, and was carrying 16 eggs. It was collected on a bottom trawl on 1980-12-10 by the FRV Kapala, trawling at a depth of about 900 m, off the New South Wales coast. The species is named for the vessel.

References

External links 

 Bathyamaryllis kapala occurrence data at GBIF

Amphipoda
Crustaceans described in 2002
Taxa named by James K. Lowry